Juan José Barrón Medina (born September 22, 1952) is a retired Mexican Luchador, or professional wrestler, under the ring name Gran Cochisse. Barrón is currently working as one of the head trainers at the Gimnasio del Diablo Velazco wrestling school in Guadalajara, Jalisco, Mexico. The school is one of the wrestling schools for Consejo Mundial de Lucha Libre (CMLL). While wrestling he used the ring character Gran Cochisse, a Native American character that incorporated traditional Native American imagery including the feathered headdresses and facepaint. He was nicknamed El Indio Bravo ("The brave Indian") and is named after the Apache chief Cochise. Early in his career he often teamed with Águila India (Indian Eagle) to form a successful tag team. During his wrestling career Barrón held the UWA World Junior Heavyweight Championship one time and the NWA World Middleweight Championship three times.

Professional wrestling career
Juan Barrón made his professional wrestling debut on October 2, 1966 at only 14 years of age, after training under Mexico's most renowned wrestling trainer Diablo Velazco. Barrón adopted a Native American character while wrestling called "Gran Cochisse" ("The Great Cochise") named after the Apache chief Cochise. Gran Cochisse wore the traditional feathered headdresses, facepaint and often carried a tomahawk with him to the ring to support the character. Gran Cochisse formed a regular tag team with Aguila India ("Indian Eagle"), to form a very popular and successful tag team. Together the team held the Occidente (western) Tag Team Championship at least once.

It was not until 1984, a full 18 years after his debut that Gran Cochisse won his first major singles title when he defeated El Satánico on AUgust 18, 1984 to win the NWA World Middleweight Championship. His first reign with the title only lasted 27 days, as he lost it to Satánico on September 14 that same year as part of a long running feud between the two. Cochisse regained the title from Satánico only a few weeks later on September 30, 1984 and held it until November 18, 1984 before losing it to Gran Hamada Gran Cochisse's third and final run with the NWA World Middleweight Championship began on May 18, 1986 when he defeated Chamaco Valaguez to win the title and lasted 152 days, longer than his previous two reigns combined, until he was pinned by Kung Fu on October 17, 1986 and lost the belt. In the latter years of the 1980s Gran Cochisse began working for the Universal Wrestling Association (UWA) where he became the UWA World Junior Light Heavyweight Champion on September 16, 1988 by defeating Blue Panther. His run with the UWA title lasted for 225 days in total, until April 29, 1989 when he was beaten by Ringo Mendoza. In the early part of the 1990s Barrón worked as an enmascarado, or masked, character called Espectro de Ultratumba ("The Ghost from beyond the grave") but by then it was obvious that his career as an active wrestler was winding down. In the late 1990s Gran Cochisse greatly reduced his schedule and began working full-time training wrestlers.

Wrestlers trained
Gran Cochisse is one of the trainers for CMLL's wrestling school in Guadalajara, Jalisco, Mexico and thus has been involved in training a lot of the wrestlers CMLL currently employs as well as students who have gone on to work for other promotions around the world. The following is a list of some of the wrestlers Gran Cochisse has trained.

Acertijo
Perro Aguayo, Jr.
Ángel de Oro
Ángel de Plata
Azazel
Casanova
Drago
El Gallo
Frail de la Muerte
Guero Loco
Hierro
Horus
Idolo
Katana
Leon Blanco
Malefico
Mascara Dorada
Metatron
Meteoro
Nube Roja
Palacio Negro
Pequeño Black Warrior
Pierroth, Jr.
Relampago Azul
Saturno
Silueta
Thunder Boy
Ultimo Dragoncito
Valentine Mayo
Virgo

Personal life
Barrón is married to retired professional wrestler La Magnífica and together they have at least four children. One their daughter wrestles as the current version of La Magnífica while another daughter wrestles under the name Super Estrella. Their son wrestles as Saturno who is under a CMLL contract. He is the father-in-law of CMLL wrestler El Sagrado who is married to one of Barrón's daughters that is not involved in professional wrestling.

Championships and accomplishments
Empresa Mexicana de Lucha Libre
NWA World Middleweight Championship (3 times)
Universal Wrestling Association
UWA World Junior Heavyweight Championship (1 time)
Western Mexico
Occidente Tag Team Championship (1 time) - with Águila India

Luchas de Apuestas record

Notes

References

1952 births
Living people
Mexican male professional wrestlers
Professional wrestling trainers
Professional wrestlers from Jalisco
20th-century professional wrestlers
NWA World Middleweight Champions
UWA World Junior Light Heavyweight Champions